Merlin Cinemas are a British cinema chain with Head Office based in England. The company was formed in 1990 and predominantly operates in small coastal towns.  In many cases, the cinemas were saved from closure and run on very small margins, but they are supported by some of the larger ones in the group that have been extensively refurbished and modernised to include luxury screens with waiter service, plus licensed bars, restaurants and live theatre.

Mainly, Merlin Cinemas operate in traditional cinema buildings rather than new builds. They operate the most Southerly cinema in the UK mainland at Penzance, and the most Northerly in Thurso.

Locations
They operate cinemas in:

Regal Cinema, Redruth

Merlin Cinemas' flagship venue is Regal  in Redruth, Cornwall, England, in the United Kingdom. The cinema opened on 2 December 1935, with seating for 982 on a semi-stadium plan. It was opened by Mr Prance as part of Sound & Movement Cinemas. The original sound system was by British Thomson-Houston. In the 1960s the cinema was equipped with CinemaScope and stereophonic sound.

When the Cornwall Circuit Group of cinemas were taken over by The Rank Group, the cinema was later sold off to independent Vivian Bartle, and in 1983 the former café area was converted into an 80-seat screen 2. The auditorium was tripled in 1986 with seating for 600 front area (screen 3) and 172 (screen 2) & 121 (Screen 1) in the rear areas. It was taken over by Merlin Cinemas on 24 July 1998.

In August 2008 the exterior of the building was fully refurbished, including a new roof, with walls re-rendered and painted in blue with red stripes ( Merlin Cinemas, colour scheme).

April 2011 saw another phase of redevelopment at the Regal with two screens going digital, screen 7 (a licensed auditorium with leather arm chairs) and screen 3 boasting Dolby 3D.

During 2012–13 the main auditorium, already the largest screen and auditorium in Cornwall, was subject to a £1.5 million transformation. Capacity increased to 650 and includes circle, stalls and box seats. To increase the number of screens from 4 to 6 the auditorium was partitioned, and two screens were placed underneath the circle. This was in addition to other work taken out on the other screens. All six screens were officially opened on 21 July 2013. All 6 screens are licensed for alcohol consumption.

Building
The exterior is a fine 1930s art deco design complete with tower and cinema name placed between horizontal strips. It was completely refurbished with new neon signage and outdoor under-pavement blue LED lighting during October and November 2007. The windows have been blocked in for the screen in the former café but the whole façade is still striking. Above the main entrance is Screen 7, which opened in 2006. This is accessed by a circular staircase from the bar and restaurant next door, and not through the main cinema entrance. In addition, Screen 7 is also unusual in having a licence, waiter service and double, sofa-style, seating and tables.

In the main foyer, which is circular in shape, the low ceiling commands you to observe the art deco design at the centre of the floor.

The plans were drawn up by an Australian architect called Mr Smith working for the Watkins Partnership in  Bristol. The most striking feature is the fin structure (to the left of the frontage) that spreads upwards into the air above the cinema. The size of this fin runs about 23 feet into the building, (about the depth of the foyer). Originally, there was a glass-lit central feature rising the full height and according to the plan had the words "cinema & café" detailed into it. This feature today has been boxed over.

Inside, the foyer executes a visual trick. The auditorium is set at a different angle to the façade by roughly 25 degrees. By creating a circular foyer the architect has disguised this fact, as without obvious side and back walls the patrons were unlikely to notice the change in direction. From the foyer were doors to a small lounge (off to the left - originally they had gold-coloured rattan chairs and glass-topped rattan tables) and stairs to the café, above the foyer. Light gained entry to the café by the large windows running across the frontage, the kitchen was placed under the large fin structure with a single window beyond the fin.

From the foyer there are steps down to the vestibule, where a cloakroom and toilets were available before entering the fan-shaped auditorium. There was a front stalls entrance and foyer set to the left of the stage. The stage had an orchestra pit and 35' wide proscenium. The projection box was placed above the raised area of seating.  It has also been reported that a colour-lit fountain was contained in the building, probably within the café. The walls of the cafe had drawings of deer and a young couple skating. The auditorium is quite plain with leaves painted on the side walls.

References

External links
Merlin Cinemas

Cinema chains in the United Kingdom
Companies based in Cornwall